Rosenbergia mandibularis is a species of beetle in the family Cerambycidae. It was described by Ritsema in 1881.

References

Batocerini
Beetles described in 1881